The 2015–16 season was Al Ain Football Club's 42rd in existence and the club's 40st consecutive season in the top-level football league in the UAE.

Club

Technical staff

Goalscorers

Includes all competitive matches. The list is sorted alphabetically by surname when total goals are equal.

Disciplinary record

|-

Assists

Hat-tricks

Clean sheets

References

External links
 Al Ain FC official website 

2015-16
Emirati football clubs 2015–16 seasons